Pantherophis vulpinus, commonly known as the foxsnake or the eastern fox snake, is a species of nonvenomous rat snake in the family Colubridae. The species is native to North America.

Taxonomy
Between about 1990 and 2011, foxsnakes were sometimes divided into two species, with P. vulpinus as the western foxsnake, and P. gloydi as the eastern foxsnake. A 2011 paper by Crother, White, Savage, Eckstut, Graham and Gardner proposed instead that the Mississippi River be established as the species boundary between two species of foxsnakes, and that those found to its east be considered P. vulpinus (including those previously known as P. gloydi) and those found to its west be given the new name P. ramspotti. This proposed that P. vulpinus, which had been known as the western foxsnake, become known as the eastern foxsnake, and the new P. ramspotti become known as the western foxsnake. Thus, P. vulpinus is sometimes called the western foxsnake and sometimes called the eastern foxsnake.

Etymology
The specific name, vulpinus, (meaning "fox-like") is in honor of Rev. Charles Fox (1815–1854), collector of the holotype, an academic play on words.

Common names
Other common names for P. vulpinus include eastern foxsnake, foxsnake, and fox snake.

Description

Dorsally, they are usually light golden brown with dark brown spots and they have a yellow checkerboard pattern on the belly.

Like most North American snakes, foxsnakes are not venomous. Foxsnakes earned their name because the musk they give off when threatened smells similar to a fox.

Geographic range
P. vulpinus is found in the upper midwestern United States east of the Mississippi river.

The geographic range of the closely related western fox snake (Pantherophis ramspotti) is west of the Mississippi river. Although the two species do overlap along the eastern side of the Mississippi River, there is no intergrade zone.

Habitat
The preferred natural habitats of P. vulpinus are varied, including open woodland, prairie, farmland, pastures, and marshlands.

Behavior
Strong and agile, fox snakes are excellent climbers, but are more often found on the ground. Fox snakes are diurnal, but may hunt at night during the hot summer months. Like all snakes, fox snakes are cold-blooded and cannot adjust their own body temperature; so these snakes often hide in burrows or under logs or rocks to stay safe from extremely hot or cold weather. In winter, they hibernate underground, where they can avoid freezing temperatures.

These docile, harmless snakes use several defensive behaviors against predators. They may shake their tails in dry leaves, sounding like rattlesnakes. They can also give off a stinky musk from glands near their tail, which makes them less appetizing to other animals. This musk has an odor similar to that of the red fox; this is the origin of the common name "fox snake". As a last resort, these snakes may hiss loudly and strike at the threat.

Diet
Foxsnakes are strict carnivores. Their primary diet consists of mice and other small rodents, but they will take any prey small enough to swallow whole, including young rabbits, frogs, fledgling birds and eggs. As constrictors, they subdue their prey by squeezing it between their coils.

Life history
Foxsnakes mate in April and May. Males wrestle with one another for the right to mate with females. In June, July or August, the female will bury a clutch of seven to 27 eggs under a log or in debris on the forest floor. These hatch after an approximately 60 day incubation period. Young fox snakes are usually much lighter in color than adults.

They are often a welcome sight around farmlands, where they consume a large number of rodents that can otherwise be harmful to crops, or transmit parasites to captive animal stocks, though they are opportunistic feeders and will sometimes also eat fledgling chickens or eggs, which sometimes leads them to be erroneously called the chicken snake.

Conservation status
The eastern foxsnake is listed as "Least Concern" on the IUCN Red List of Threatened and Endangered Species, and it is not listed on CITES. While this snake is common within its range, many states have protected it, primarily to prevent over-collection for the pet trade.

References

Further reading
Baird SF, Girard CF (1853). Catalogue of North American Reptiles in the Museum of the Smithsonian Institution. Part I.—Serpents. Washington, District of Columbia: Smithsonian Institution. xvi + 172 pp. (Scotophis vulpinus, new species, pp. 75–76).
Behler JL, King FW (1979). National Audubon Society Field Guide to North American Reptiles and Amphibians. New York: Knopf. 743 pp. . (Elaphe vulpina, pp. 608–609).
Boulenger GA (1894). Catalogue of the Snakes in the British Museum (Natural History). Volume II., Containing the Conclusion of the Colubridæ Aglyphæ. London: Trustees of the British Museum (Natural History). (Taylor and Francis, printers). xi + 382 pp. + Plates I-XX. (Coluber vulpinus, p. 49).
Conant R (1975). A Field Guide to Reptiles and Amphibians of Eastern and Central North America, Second Edition. Boston: Houghton Mifflin. xviii + 429 pp. + Plates 1-48.  (hardcover),  (paperback). (Elaphe vulpina vulpina, pp. 191–193, Figure 44 + Plate 28 + Map 148).
Conant R, Bridges W (1939). What Snake is That?: A Field Guide to the Snakes of the United States East of the Rocky Mountains. New York and London: D. Appleton-Century. Frontispiece map + 163 pp. + Plates A-C, 1-32. (Elaphe vulpina, pp. 62–63 + Plate 9, Figure 26). 
Harding JH (1997). Amphibians and Reptiles of the Great Lakes Region. Ann Arbor: University of Michigan Press. 400 pp. .
Saviola AJ, McKenzie VJ, Chiszar D (2012). "Chemosensory responses to chemical and visual stimuli in five species of colubrid snakes". Acta Herpetologica 7 (1): 91–103. (Mintonius vulpina, new combination).
Smith HM, Brodie ED Jr (1982). Reptiles of North America: A Guide to Field Identification. New York: Golden Press. 240 pp. . (Elaphe vulpina pp. 186–187).
Wright AH, Wright AA (1957). Handbook of Snakes of the United States and Canada. Ithaca and London: Comstock. 1,105 pp. (in 2 volumes). (Elaphe vulpina vulpina, pp. 262–266, Figure 81 + Map 23 on p. 223).
Zim HS, Smith HM (1956). Reptiles and Amphibians: A Guide to Familiar American Species: A Golden Nature Guide. New York: Simon and Schuster. 160 pp. (Elaphe vulpina, pp. 92–93, 156).

External links
Pantherophis vulpinus (Baird & Girard , 1853), The Reptile Database
Pantherophis vulpinus (Eastern Foxsnake, Eastern Fox Snake), The IUCN Red List of Threatened Species
Pantherophis vulpinus (Baird & Girard, 1853) – Eastern Foxsnake, The Illinois Natural History Survey
Western Fox Snake (Pantherophis vulpinus), Reptiles and Amphibians of Iowa

Colubrids
Reptiles described in 1853
Taxa named by Spencer Fullerton Baird